Bhanbhane  is a town and municipality in Gulmi District in the Lumbini Zone of central Nepal. According to the 1991 Nepal census, it had a population of 3103 people living in 607 individual households.

References

External links
UN map of the municipalities of Gulmi District

Populated places in Gulmi District